Samat Kabiruly Smakov (born 8 December 1978) is a Kazakhstani football manager and a former player who played as a defender. He is the manager of FC Yelimay Semey.

Club career
Smakov started his career in his home town Semey playing for FC Elimay, and has since played for different teams, including FC Rostov in Russian Premier League. He is a four-time champion of Kazakhstan with four clubs. Having strong leadership qualities, he has captained most of his teams. He held FC Aktobe's club record for most Premier League appearances, before being surpassed by Yuri Logvinenko, in August 2013. 

In October 2014, Smakov, along with Dmitri Khomich, Mikhail Bakayev, Zaurbek Pliyev and Aleksandr Kislitsyn, was banned from training with FC Kairat by the club. On 6 January 2015, Smakov, along with Aleksandr Kislitsyn, moved to FC Irtysh Pavlodar.

On 4 August 2016, Smakov signed for FC Ordabasy until the end of the 2016 season.

International career
Samat received his first cap for Kazakhstan on 31 March 2000 in an Asian Cup qualifier against Jordan at the age of 18. Since that time Smakov was capped in all major matches of Kazakhstan, including World Cup 2002, World Cup 2006 and Euro 2008 qualifiers. As of June 2016 he has played 74 international matches and scored two goals, his first goal a penalty against Belgium in September 2007. Many times he led the team as a captain. Currently he holds a record as the most capped player of the Kazakhstan national football team with 74 matches as of June 2016.

Post-playing career
On 7 January 2018, Ordabasy announced that Smakov had joined his former club Aktobe as their new General Director.

Career statistics

International

Statistics accurate as of match played 11 October 2016

Scores and results list Kazakhstan's goal tally first.

Honours

Club
Yelimay
Kazakhstan Premier League: 1998

Irtysh-Bastau
Kazakhstan Premier League: 1999

Zhenis Astana
Kazakhstan Cup: 2002

Kairat
Kazakhstan Premier League: 2004

Aktobe
Kazakhstan Premier League: 2007, 2008, 2009
Kazakhstan Cup: 2010
Kazakhstan Super Cup: 2008, 2010

Individual
 Kazakhstani Footballer of the Year: 2004, 2008
 GOAL Journal Player of the Year: 2004, 2007, 2008, 2009, 2010

References

External links
 Video
Personal Blog at National Team Website 

"КАЙРАТ" ОБЪЯВИЛ О ПОДПИСАНИИ СМАКОВА И ЛОРИЯ (Russian)

1978 births
Living people
Sportspeople from Semey
Kazakhstani footballers
Association football defenders
FC Rostov players
Kazakhstan international footballers
FC Zhenis Astana players
Russian Premier League players
FC Kairat players
FC Spartak Semey players
FC Aktobe players
Çaykur Rizespor footballers
FC Irtysh Pavlodar players
Kazakhstan Premier League players
Kazakhstani expatriate footballers
Expatriate footballers in Turkey
Kazakhstani expatriate sportspeople in Turkey
Kazakhstani football managers